Francis Eugene Walter (May 26, 1894 – May 31, 1963) was a Democratic member of the U.S. House of Representatives from Pennsylvania. Walter was a prominent member of the House Un-American Activities Committee from 1951 to 1963, serving as chair of that committee for the last nine of those years.  He was a Democrat who wanted to minimize immigration and was largely responsible for the McCarran–Walter Act of 1952, which kept the old quotas but also opened up many new opportunities for legal immigration to the US.

Background

Francis E. Walter was born in Easton, Pennsylvania. He attended Lehigh University, George Washington University and Georgetown University.

Career

During both World Wars I and II he served in the air service of the United States Navy. He was the director of the Broad Street Trust Company in Philadelphia, Pennsylvania, and of the Easton National Bank in Easton. From 1928-33 he was the Solicitor of Northampton County, Pennsylvania. He was a delegate to the 1928 Democratic National Convention. He was elected as a Democrat to the 73rd United States Congress and served until his death in Washington, D.C.  In 1947-8, he served on the Herter Committee.

Walter is best known for the McCarran-Walter Act, passed over President Truman's veto in 1952, which, while it opened naturalization to Asian immigrants for the first time, continued the immigration quota system based on national origin introduced in 1924, and allowed the U.S. government to deport and/or bar from re-entry those identified as subversives, particularly members and former members of the Communist Party. In 1944, he presented President Roosevelt with a letter opener made of an arm bone of a fallen Japanese soldier.

Walter's views were regarded by some as "reactionary and racist". A staunch anti-Communist, he served as chairman of the House Un-American Activities Committee during the 84th through 88th Congresses. Walter also served as a director of the Pioneer Fund, a foundation best known for its advocacy of IQ variation among races.

Walter appeared in a central role in the 1960s-era U.S. government anti-Communist propaganda film Operation Abolition. Historical footage of Walter also appears in the 1990 documentary film Berkeley in the Sixties.

Death
He died in 1963, aged 69, from leukemia and was interred at Arlington National Cemetery.

See also
 List of United States Congress members who died in office (1950–99)
 List of members of the House Un-American Activities Committee

Footnotes

Further reading
Dimmitt, Marius Albert, Sr. The Enactment of the McCarran-Walter Act of 1952. Ph.D. dissertation, University of Kansas, 1970

External links

 Retrieved on 2009-02-21
The Political Graveyard
 Letters to Francis E. Walter. Available online through Lehigh University's I Remain: A Digital Archive of Letters, Manuscripts, and Ephemera.

1894 births
1963 deaths
20th-century American politicians
American Lutherans
American anti-communists
American bankers
Burials at Arlington National Cemetery
Businesspeople from Pennsylvania
Deaths from cancer in Washington, D.C.
Deaths from leukemia
Democratic Party members of the United States House of Representatives from Pennsylvania
George Washington University alumni
Georgetown University alumni
Lehigh University alumni
Military personnel from Pennsylvania
Politicians from Easton, Pennsylvania
United States Navy personnel of World War II
United States Navy personnel of World War I